Cameron Davis (born 21 February 1995) is an Australian professional golfer. He had a successful amateur career, winning the Australian Amateur and the individual and team events at the Eisenhower Trophy. He has played regularly on the PGA Tour since 2018, and won the 2021 Rocket Mortgage Classic.

Amateur career
Davis had a successful amateur career. In 2015 he won the Australian Amateur and was a runner-up in the Asia-Pacific Amateur Championship, behind Jin Cheng. In 2016 he was part of the Australian team who won the Eisenhower Trophy in Mexico and he was also the individual winner. The Australian team won the team event by 19 strokes and Davis finished 2 strokes ahead of fellow-Australian Curtis Luck in the individual event.

Professional career
Davis turned professional in late 2016. He played in the OHL Classic at Mayakoba on the PGA Tour and finished tied for 15th place.

Davis qualified for the 2017 PGA Tour Canada by finishing fourth in the Q-school. He was tied for 14th in his first event, the Freedom 55 Financial Open, but had a disappointing season, finishing 76th on the tour's rankings and losing his card. In November he won the Emirates Australian Open, a stroke ahead of Jonas Blixt and Matt Jones, after a final round 64 for his first professional win and automatic qualification into the 2018 Open Championship, as the tournament was part of the Open Qualifying Series. Davis also had status on the Web.com Tour for 2018 after reaching the final round of Q School, despite starting at the First Stage. Davis won the 2018 Nashville Golf Open, and finished 7th on the Web.com Tour money list to secure his PGA Tour card. 

Davis struggled during the 2018-2019 PGA Tour season, and finished 160th on the FedEx Cup points list. However, he rebounded and finished 84th during the 2019–20 season.

In July 2021, Davis earned his first PGA Tour victory by defeating Troy Merritt and Joaquín Niemann in a playoff at the Rocket Mortgage Classic. He ended the season 37th on the FedEx Cup points list.

In September 2022, Davis was selected for the International team in the 2022 Presidents Cup at Quail Hollow Club; he played all five matches, winning two and losing three.

Amateur wins
2014 Victorian Amateur Championship
2015 Australian Amateur, New South Wales Medal
2016 Eisenhower Trophy (individual title)

Professional wins (4)

PGA Tour wins (1)

PGA Tour playoff record (1–0)

PGA Tour of Australasia wins (1)

Web.com Tour wins (1)

Other wins (1)

Results in major championships
Results not in chronological order before 2019 and in 2020.

"T" indicates a tie for a place
NT = No tournament due to COVID-19 pandemic

Results in The Players Championship

CUT = missed the halfway cut
"T" indicates a tie for a place

Results in World Golf Championships

1Cancelled due to COVID-19 pandemic

NT = No tournament

Team appearances
Amateur
Nomura Cup (representing Australia): 2013 (winners)
Eisenhower Trophy (representing Australia): 2016 (winners, individual leader)
Australian Men's Interstate Teams Matches (representing New South Wales): 2013, 2014, 2015, 2016 (winners)

Professional
Presidents Cup (representing the International team): 2022

See also
2018 Web.com Tour Finals graduates
2019 Korn Ferry Tour Finals graduates

References

External links
 
 

Australian male golfers
PGA Tour of Australasia golfers
PGA Tour golfers
Korn Ferry Tour graduates
Golfers from Sydney
1995 births
Living people